Otú Airport  is an airport located in the village of Otú and serving the town of Remedios, a municipality of the Antioquia Department in Colombia. It is also known as Alberto Jaramillo Sanchez Airport.

Currently only Aerolínea de Antioquia operates from this airport, with two daily flights on Twin Otter aircraft to Enrique Olaya Herrera Airport in Medellín. Previously, the airline ACES flew between this airport and Medellin several times per day on aircraft including the Let L-410 Turbolet, Cessna 206 and Twin Otter. The airport's runway is also used as a small military base for the Air Force and National Police.

The Otu VOR-DME (Ident: OTU) is located on the field.

See also
Transport in Colombia
List of airports in Colombia

References

External links 
 
SkyVector - Otú
OpenStreetMap - Otú
FallingRain - Otú Airport
Google Maps - Otú

Airports in Colombia
Buildings and structures in Antioquia Department